The British Independent Film Award for Best Debut Screenwriter is an annual award given by the British Independent Film Awards (BIFA) to recognize the best British debut screenwriter. The award was first presented in the 2016 ceremony.

According to BIFA, the award is for a "British screenwriter for their debut fiction feature film". The award usually goes to one screenwriter with co-writers being eligible when there is no lead screenwriter credited for the film.

Winners and nominees

2010s

2020s

See also
 BAFTA Award for Outstanding Debut by a British Writer, Director or Producer

References

External links
 Official website

British Independent Film Awards